is a Japanese global beer, spirits, soft drinks and food business group headquartered in Sumida, Tokyo.

In 2019, the group had revenue of JPY 2.1 trillion. Asahi's business portfolio can be segmented as follows: alcoholic beverage business (40.5%), overseas business (32%), soft drinks business (17.2%), food business (5.4%) and "other" business (4.9%). Asahi, with a 37% market share, is the largest of the four major beer brewers in Japan followed by Kirin Beer with 34% and Suntory with 16%. In response to a maturing domestic Japanese beer market, Asahi broadened its geographic footprint and business portfolio inorganically through the acquisition of highly coveted beer businesses in Western Europe and Central Eastern Europe. This has resulted in Asahi having a large market share in many European countries, such as a beer market share of 44% in the Czech Republic, 32% in Poland, 36% in Romania, and 18% in Italy.

History
During World War I, German prisoners worked in the brewery.

In 1990, Asahi acquired a 19.9% stake in Australian brewery giant Elders IXL which has since become the Foster's Group, later sold to SABMiller.

In 2009, Asahi acquired the Australian beverages unit Schweppes Australia, now known as Asahi Beverages.

In early 2009, Asahi acquired 19.9% of Tsingtao Brewery from Anheuser-Busch InBev for $667 million. The sale made Asahi Breweries, Ltd. the second largest shareholder in Tsingtao behind only the Tsingtao Brewery Group.

In July 2011, Asahi acquired New Zealand juice maker Charlie's and the water and juice divisions of Australian beverage company P&N Beverages.

In August 2011, Asahi acquired New Zealand's Independent Liquor, maker of Vodka Cruiser and other alcoholic beverages, for  billion.

In May 2013 its New Zealand operations expanded with the purchase of retail chain Mill Liquorsave. Also, Asahi acquired the Australian brands and assets of Cricketers Arms and Mountain Goat Brewery in 2013 and 2015, respectively.

The first of these transactions happened as a result of Anheuser-Busch InBev (InBev) agreeing in April 2016 to sell its Dutch business Grolsch Brewery, Italian business Peroni Brewery and the UK's craft Meantime Brewery and SABMiller Brands UK to Asahi; this €2.3 billion deal closed on 12 October 2016. After Inbev's acquisition of SABMiller in October 2016, InBev agreed to sell the former SABMiller Ltd.'s Eastern European businesses and relevant assets in Poland, the Czech Republic, Slovakia, Hungary and Romania to Asahi for US $7.3 billion. The deal closed on 21 December 2016 and included beer brands such as Pilsner Urquell, Velkopopovický Kozel, Topvar,  Tyskie, Lech, Dreher and Ursus.

In 2017, the company sold its 19.9% stake of Tsingtao Brewery for $937 million.

In 2019, the company bought Fuller's beer business from Fuller, Smith & Turner plc for an enterprise value of £250 million. The assets sold comprised the entirety of Fuller's beer, cider and soft drinks brewing and production, wine wholesaling, as well as the distribution thereof and also includes the Griffin Brewery, Cornish Orchards, Dark Star Brewing and Nectar Imports 

In May 2020, the Australian Foreign Investment Review Board approved the company's $16 billion bid for Carlton & United Breweries, and the deal will see Asahi ending up with about 48.5 per cent share of the Australian beer market.

Brands
The company's primary beer, from 1957 through the late 1980s, was Asahi Gold (overtaking Asahi Draft, its original formula, which remains in production). However, Asahi Super Dry, introduced in 1987, is now the company's flagship beer brand.

Asahi Super Dry, a product that transformed the modern beer industry in Japan, is described as a highly attenuated lager without the heavier malt flavors of competitors' products, with a crisp, dry taste reminiscent of some northern German beers. This highly successful launch led to a significant rise in consumer demand for dry beer and in turn to a dramatic turnaround in Asahi's business performance, surpassing Kirin in terms of both sales and profitability.

Other beers produced include:
Asahi Draft – Lager (first produced in 1892)
Asahi Gold – Lager (former flagship product; first produced in 1957)
Asahi Stout
Asahi Z – Dry lager
Asahi Black – a 5% abv dark lager
Asahi Prime Time – German Pilsener style lager (only available in Japan)

Brands acquired from Anheuser-Busch InBev:
Grolsch Brewery
Peroni Brewery
Meantime Brewery
Gambrinus
Pilsner Urquell
Radegast
Velkopopovický Kozel 
Tyskie 
Lech
Dreher
Ursus
Carlton & United Breweries

Asahi Beer Hall

Asahi Breweries' headquarters in Tokyo were designed by French designer Philippe Starck. The Beer Hall is considered one of Tokyo's most recognizable modern structures.

See also
 Beer in Japan
 Asahi Soft Drinks

References

External links

  Wiki collection of bibliographic works on Asahi Breweries

 
Breweries in Japan
Companies based in Tokyo
Multinational companies headquartered in Japan
Food and drink companies established in 1889
Japanese companies established in 1889
Japanese brands
Companies listed on the Tokyo Stock Exchange
Multinational breweries